Donald Scott (born 15 April 1928) is a former Scotland international rugby union player. Normally a centre, he also played on the wing.

Rugby career

Amateur career

Scott played for – and was internationally capped whilst at – Langholm and Watsonians.

Provincial career

He broke through while playing with Langholm to play for the South. He was part of the South team that beat North 10 points to 9 on 11 November 1950.

Whilst with Watsonians he played for Edinburgh District. He played in the 1952–53 season's Inter-City match but lost to Glasgow District.

He played in the Scottish Inter-District Championship in its first season. In that 1953–54 season, Edinburgh District won the first championship.

International career

He was capped for  ten times from 1950 to 1953, playing in nine Five Nations matches. He was capped at Centre and Wing.

He never scored an international try, though during the Five Nations match against England in 1950, both he and teammate Donald Sloan pounced on a high kick over the try line. As both got up, Scott patted Sloan on the back and the try was awarded to Sloan.

Scott also played in Scotland's 44–0 defeat to South Africa in 1951. He remembered: "When I played in any match there were three things I thought the man opposite me might do:- they would run at me and try to beat me; they would run at me and pass the ball; or they would kick the ball. Well, the South Africans did all that, but they also did something I had never seen before: they ran into you. They looked at you and said: come and take me. You watch rugby now and it is all about contact, and laying the ball off in different ways. That was the first time I saw that approach."

Outside of rugby

Scott was a teacher at George Watson's College. He coached the school's 1st XV at rugby union.

References

1928 births
Possibly living people
Edinburgh District (rugby union) players
Langholm RFC players
Rugby union centres
Rugby union players from Langholm
Rugby union wings
Scotland international rugby union players
Scottish rugby union players
South of Scotland District (rugby union) players
Watsonians RFC players